The  is a mid-size sedan introduced by Honda in 1990 derived from Honda Accord chassis. The first Inspire debuted in 1990 as the Accord Inspire, a sister nameplate to the Honda Vigor, but sold at different retail channels in Japan, known as Honda Verno for the Vigor/Saber, and the Inspire at Honda Clio stores.

In 1995, the Inspire was updated and exported to the US as the Acura 3.2 TL, while the Vigor nameplate was replaced with the Honda Saber. The longitudinal 2.5 L straight-5 engine layout and platform remained and was sold as the Acura 2.5 TL.

In 1999, these cars were replaced by the second generation TL that was based on the US-spec Accord platform, and largely designed and engineered in the US by Honda R&D Americas, Inc. in Raymond, Ohio. Manufactured in the US, these were imported into Japan as the new Inspire and Saber.

In June 2003, the fourth-generation Inspire was introduced in Japan derived from the North American Honda Accord V6. This Inspire marks the first time Honda introduced their Variable Cylinder Management technology. In October 2005, the fourth-generation Inspire received a mild restyle, with new headlights, new tail lights, revised interior and new colors. The Inspire targeted the Nissan Teana, the Toyota Mark X and numerous other entry level luxury cars from Japan.

In October 2007, the fifth-generation Inspire was previewed at the Tokyo Motor Show. It is essentially a rebadged 2008 North American market Accord with minor exterior and interior modifications.

In September 2012, after 6 generations and the introduction of the ninth-generation Accord, the Inspire ended production for a short period after 23 years before relaunching in 2018 as a China-only model based on the tenth-generation Accord.



First generation series CB5, CC2 & CC3 (1989–1995)

On October 12, 1989, the Honda Accord Inspire was introduced. The platform was shared with the Honda Vigor, a JDM Honda Accord derived five-cylinder luxury sedan available only at Honda Verno dealerships. The Inspire was introduced before the recession developed in Japan in the early 1990s (known in Japan as the "bubble economy"), and Honda wanted a car that would compete with the Toyota Cresta and Nissan Laurel, with the unique inline 5-cylinder Honda G engine, in a front-wheel-drive configuration. The SOHC four valves per cylinder G20A inline-five engine was all new and was also used in the JDM Honda Rafaga, which was a shorter sedan shared with the second generation Honda Ascot. In Japan, the smaller G20A engine used regular grade fuel, while the larger G25A engine used premium grade fuel.

The body style was a four-door hardtop, but it wasn't a true hardtop, using a "B" pillar between the front and rear passenger compartments, and instead it used frameless doors. The Inspire was available in two versions; a shorter and narrower version badged as the Accord Inspire, with a G20A 2.0-liter engine in compliance with Japanese vehicle size requirements for cars classified as "compact". The CB5 Inspire was offered in three trim levels: the base AZ-i with manual transmission, AG-I with fog lamps and optional sunroof as well as central locking, and the top spec luxury AX-i with leather upholstery, more safety features and full cruise control as well as power seats. A longer and wider version with the G20 (CC3) or with the new G25A 2.5-liter engine (CC2) debuted in early 1992, similar in dimensions to the first generation Legend. The larger CC2 and CC3 Inspire was a mild makeover of the first CB5 Inspire, featuring updated full-width boot lamps (the updated Vigor had conventional single lamp units) with less chrome, larger bumpers with new wrap-around cornering lamp design (instead of the optional separate units like the CB5) and mesh alloy wheels. The new 2.5 develops . The CC2/CC3 Inspire shared more features with the Acura Vigor under a 'wide-body' marketing campaign with minor differences. The smaller-bodied Accord Inspire continued to be available alongside the larger CC2/CC3 until the introduction of the second generation Inspire, as it fit a much lower tax category.

The Inspire offered a luxurious approach to the interior as a lower price alternative to the top level Legend, and both vehicles were sold at Honda Clio dealerships. Interior appearance was provided by the Japanese furniture company, Tendo Mokko, offering unique leather interior and a choice of genuine wood inserts for the dashboard and center console.

The transmission is attached behind the engine, with a driveshaft that sends power to the front of the car to an asymmetrically installed limited-slip differential which then supplies power to the front wheels using half shafts; this allowed the powertrain to remain slightly behind the front wheels. This also gave the car a 60:40 front to rear weight distribution. The turning radius of the Inspire also was not as tight as its competitors due to the use of Constant-velocity joint installed on the front axle half shafts, but the Inspire did have an advantage in adverse traction conditions.

Second generation series UA1 through UA3 (1995–1998)

The second generation Inspire was almost identical in its dimensions to the first generation 1986 Honda Legend, with that vehicle having been updated and enlarged to better fit the role of flagship for the Honda and Acura brands. The second generation Inspire was available with the Type I 3.2 L V6 offered in the Legend on July 6, 1995, while still offering the straight 5 in both 2.0 L and 2.5 L versions. The luxury approach was enhanced. A carryover from the previous generation saw marginal increases in length, width, and height dimensions for vehicles installed with the V6 engine, but the smaller dimensions were not in compliance with Japanese government regulations concerning dimensions and maximum engine displacement, thereby giving buyers an incentive in interior accommodations when purchasing the V6 model. Each engine choice obligated the Japanese buyer with increased annual road tax liability, and one trim level package was designated with the engine choice, offering stepped levels of standard and luxury equipment for each selection..

Starting with this generation, all Inspire and Saber vehicles were manufactured at Honda's Marysville Auto Plant in Ohio, USA.

November 8, 1996 saw the introduction of dual airbags for front seat passengers and anti-lock brakes as standard.

This version of the Inspire competed with the Toyota Camry Gracia, Mark II, Cresta and Chaser, the Nissan Cefiro and Skyline, the Mazda Millenia and the Mitsubishi Diamante.

Third generation series UA4 and UA5 (1998–2003)

The third generation Honda Inspire/Saber was introduced October 15, 1998, and was the first Honda designed and built in the US and exported to Japan. In North America, this vehicle was sold as the Acura TL, while in Japan it was the second model that accompanied the flagship Honda Legend at Honda Clio Japanese dealerships. The Saber version of this car was sold as the top level sedan at Honda Verno. Honda's internet-based navigation system Internavi was introduced with this generation.

The Inspire no longer offered the straight-five engine, and instead offered the VTEC-equipped 3.2-litre J32A and 2.5-litre J25A V6 engines, and a choice of a 4- or 5-speed automatic transmission. The bodystyle was changed from hardtop to sedan as a result of the USA-spec Accord having been upgraded to meet USA requirements for improved side impact protection. A cabin air filter, also known as a pollen filter is introduced with this generation and is located behind the glove compartment for all vehicles sold internationally.

The Honda Saber was discontinued April 2003 along with the consolidation of the Honda Japan sales networks Primo, Clio and Verno.

Fourth generation series UC1 (2003–2007)

The fourth generation Honda Inspire was introduced June 18, 2003. This vehicle was built at the Saitama Prefecture facility in Sayama, Japan. It was built on the same platform as the North American seventh generation Honda Accord. Unlike the North American variant it was based on, the Inspire would only come in the sedan body style, while powertrain was only available with the 3.0 L J30A V6 with i-VTEC, and a 5-speed automatic transmission. It was available in three trims including 30TE, 30TL, and AVANZARE, with the latter being the highest trim. A 30TE limited trim would be available for the 2005 model year.

Styling would be consistent between the Inspire and Accord it was based upon. Notable differences would include standard fog lights on all trims, a redesigned grill, and a new light on the trunk lid. The headlights are different as well featuring High-intensity discharge lamp bulbs for the low beams. A new styling was introduced November 4, 2005, changing both the front grille and rear tail lights, in which LED lighting would be implemented.

This was the first vehicle to showcase Honda's Variable Cylinder Management (VCM) technology. Another technology introduced on the Inspire was Honda's Collision Mitigation Brake System (CMBS, originally introduced as CMS). Honda also made available its Intelligent Highway Cruise Control (IHCC), "C-MOS", which utilized a front-mounted camera to assist in unwanted lane drifting. An Internet-based navigation service called Internavi is available for drivers in Japan.

Fifth generation series CP3 (2007–2012)

The fifth generation Honda Inspire was released on December 21, 2007 in Japan. Like the fourth generation Inspire, the fifth generation would be based on the North American eighth generation Honda Accord. Unlike the North American car it was based upon, and like its predecessor, the fifth generation Inspire would only be available as a sedan with a V6. It would use a similar 5-speed automatic transmission, but power would be increased by switching to the 3.5 L J35Z2 i-VTEC VCM V6 (marked as J35A-80).

It would continue to have technologies such as Collision Mitigation Brake System (CMBS), Intelligent Highway Cruise Control (IHCC), and Honda's Internavi  telematics subscription service. A notable change would be the change to Electric power-steering (EPS). This was in effort to reduce power demands on the engine, thereby improving fuel economy.

There are few exterior and interior differences between this Inspire and the Southeast Asian Honda Accord. Sales of this generation of the Inspire ended September 2012 in Japan.

Sixth generation series CV4 and CV6 (2018–present)

The sixth generation Inspire was released in 2018 as a sedan designed exclusively for the Chinese market. It is based on the North American tenth generation Honda Accord with a redesigned front and rear DRG. The sixth generation Inspire is made by Dongfeng Honda to replace the Spirior.

It is available with either the 1.5-liter L15B7 inline-four or the 2-liter LFB11/12 inline-four.

References

External links

  Official Inspire Archive
  Inspire Family Tree

Inspire
2000s cars
Cars introduced in 1990
Slanted engines
2010s cars